The Central Valley Project (CVP) is a federal power and water management project in the U.S. state of California under the supervision of the United States Bureau of Reclamation (USBR). It was devised in 1933 in order to provide irrigation and municipal water to much of California's Central Valley—by regulating and storing water in reservoirs in the northern half of the state (once considered water-rich but suffering water-scarce conditions more than half the year in most years), and transporting it to the water-poor San Joaquin Valley and its surroundings by means of a series of canals, aqueducts and pump plants, some shared with the California State Water Project (SWP). Many CVP water users are represented by the Central Valley Project Water Association.

In addition to water storage and regulation, the system has a hydroelectric capacity of over 2,000 megawatts, and provides recreation and flood control with its twenty dams and reservoirs. It has allowed major cities to grow along Valley rivers which previously would flood each spring, and transformed the semi-arid desert environment of the San Joaquin Valley into productive farmland. Freshwater stored in Sacramento River reservoirs and released downriver during dry periods prevents salt water from intruding into the Sacramento-San Joaquin Delta during high tide. There are eight divisions of the project and ten corresponding units, many of which operate in conjunction, while others are independent of the rest of the network. California agriculture and related industries now directly account for 7% of the gross state product for which the CVP supplied water for about half.

Many CVP operations have had considerable environmental consequences, including a decline in the salmon population of four major California rivers in the northern state, and the reduction of riparian zones and wetlands. Many historical sites and Native American tribal lands have been flooded by CVP reservoirs. In addition, runoff from intensive irrigation has polluted rivers and groundwater. The Central Valley Project Improvement Act, passed in 1992, intends to alleviate some of the problems associated with the CVP with programs like the Refuge Water Supply Program.

In recent years, a combination of drought and regulatory decisions passed based on the Endangered Species Act of 1973 have forced Reclamation to turn off much of the water for the west side of the San Joaquin Valley in order to protect the fragile ecosystem in the Sacramento-San Joaquin Delta and keep alive the dwindling fish populations of Northern and Central California rivers. In 2017 the Klamath and Trinity rivers witnessed the worst fall run Chinook salmon return in recorded history, leading to a disaster declaration in California and Oregon due to the loss of the commercial fisheries. The recreational fall Chinook salmon fishery in both the ocean and the Trinity and Klamath rivers was also closed in 2017. Only 1,123 adult winter Chinook salmon returned to the Sacramento Valley in 2017, according to a report sent to the Pacific Fishery Management Council (PFMC) by the California Department of Fish and Wildlife (CDFW). This is the second lowest number of returning adult winter run salmon since modern counting techniques were implemented in 2003. By comparison, over 117,000 winter Chinooks returned to spawn in 1969.

Overview

Operations 

Two large reservoirs, Shasta Lake and Trinity Lake, are formed by a pair of dams in the mountains north of the Sacramento Valley. Water from Shasta Lake flows into the Sacramento River which flows to the Sacramento-San Joaquin Delta and water from Trinity Lake flows into the Trinity River which leads to the Pacific Ocean. Both lakes release water at controlled rates. There, before it can flow on to San Francisco Bay and the Pacific Ocean, some of the water is intercepted by a diversion channel and transported to the Delta-Mendota Canal, which conveys water southwards through the San Joaquin Valley, supplying water to San Luis Reservoir (a SWP-shared facility) and the San Joaquin River at Mendota Pool in the process, eventually reaching canals that irrigates farms in the valley. Friant Dam crosses the San Joaquin River upstream of Mendota Pool, diverting its water southwards into canals that travel into the Tulare Lake area of the San Joaquin Valley, as far south as the Kern River. Finally, New Melones Lake, a separate facility, stores water flow of a San Joaquin River tributary for use during dry periods. Other smaller, independent facilities exist to provide water to local irrigation districts.

Background 
The Central Valley Project was the world's largest water and power project when undertaken during Franklin D. Roosevelt's New Deal public works agenda.  The Project was the culmination of eighty years of political fighting over the state's most important natural resource - Water.  The Central Valley of California lies to the west of the Sierra Nevada Mountains with its annual run-off draining into the Pacific Ocean through the Sacramento–San Joaquin River Delta. It is a large receding geological floodplain moderated by its Mediterranean climate of dry summers and wet winters that includes regular major drought cycles. At the time of its construction, the project was at the center of a political and cultural battle over the state's future.  It intersected with the state's ongoing war over land use, access to water rights, impacts on indigenous communities, large vs. small farmers, the state's irrigation districts and public vs. private power. Its proponents ignored environmental concerns over its impacts, other than the outcome not damage the major stakeholders at that time.

The Central Valley of California has gone through two distinct culturally driven land use eras. The first was the indigenous tribal period that lasted for thousands of years. Then came the arrival of Europeans, first by the Spanish colonial model of Catholic missions and ranchos (1772–1846) was then followed by the current United States era. Due to its Mediterranean climate, the first cultural period was hunter-gatherer based. The Spanish missions' ranching and tanning business was based on the forced labor of Las Californias tribes. Spain's model of land use with the grazing of livestock for meat, wool and leather started along Alta California's coast eventually spreading inland.  The U.S. era evolved from primarily ranching to large-scale plantations or more commonly known today as corporate farming that turned the Central Valley into the breadbasket of the U.S.

Following the 1848 California Gold Rush, large numbers of U.S. citizens came into the region and made attempts to practice rainfed agriculture, but most of the Central Valley land was taken up by large cattle ranchers like Henry Miller who eventually controlled 22,000 square miles of land. The large-scale levee construction by Chinese workers along the Delta was where limited irrigation for orchards first started.

Following the arrival of the Transcontinental railroad, immigration from Asia and the rest of the U.S. led to growing numbers of settlers in the region. Despite the rich soils and favorable weather of the  Central Valley, immigrants to the valley who were unfamiliar with its seasonal patterns of rainfall and flooding began to take up irrigation practices.  Farmers soon found themselves troubled by frequent floods in the Sacramento Valley and a general lack of water in the San Joaquin Valley. The Sacramento River, which drains the northern part, receives between 60 and 75% of the precipitation in the Valley, despite the Sacramento Valley covering less area than the much larger San Joaquin Valley, drained by the San Joaquin River, which receives only about 25% of the rainfall. Furthermore, cities drawing water from the Sacramento-San Joaquin Delta faced problems in dry summer and autumn months when the inflowing water was low. In order to continue to sustain the valley's economy, there needed to be systems to regulate flows in the rivers and equally distribute water among the north and south parts of the valley.

History

In 1873, Barton S. Alexander completed a report for the U.S. Army Corps of Engineers that was the first attempt at creating a Central Valley Project. In 1904, the Bureau of Reclamation (then the Reclamation Service) first became interested in creating such a water project, but did not get far involved until a series of droughts and related disasters occurred in the early 1920s. The State of California passed the Central Valley Project Act in 1933, which authorized Reclamation to sell revenue bonds in order to raise about $170 million for the project. Unfortunately, because of insufficient money in the state's treasury and the coincidence with the Great Depression, California turned to the national government for funding to build the project. This resulted in several transfers of the project between California and the federal government, and between Reclamation and the Army Corps of Engineers. The first dams and canals of the project started going up in the late 1930s, and the last facilities were completed in the early 1970s. Other features of the project were never constructed, some lie partly finished, or are still awaiting authorization.

Timeline 

 pre-western arrival – Tribal culture - seasonal migratory locations between the Tulares and Sierra foothills
 1493 – The Papal Bull known as the Discovery Doctrine, in Latin titled the "Inter Caetera", gave Spain the right to take land and convert the indigenous occupants to Christianity in areas west of the Inter Caetera's line of demarcation, which divided the Western Hemisphere
 1769–76 – The arrival of Spain and its Spanish missions in California - Indians promised sovereign control
 1822 - Republic of Mexico formed - breaks with Spain's sovereign promise to California Mission Indians
 1823 - The Papal Bulls that made up the Discovery doctrine from 1455 and 1493 becomes part of U.S. Law
 1833 - Secularization Act closes California Missions and sells off church properties
  The act initiated the transfer of 64 million acres of tribal lands via land grants or Ranchos to former Spanish citizens of Californio 
 1846 Bear Flag Rebellion - as part of the Mexican–American War and U.S. invasion of California - Republic of California 
 1846 - John Fremont kills original owner of the largest North American mercury mine at New Almaden after failing to buy it
 1846 - Yerba Buena land grant takes its name from local Catholic mission and becomes San Francisco
 1848 - Treaty of Guadalupe Hidalgo promises Mexican-Americans ownership of their Ranchos (ranches) and water rights
 1849 - Influx of 80,000 immigrants during Gold Rush includes riots and land theft by squatter movement
 Sept-Oct - Californians meets in Monterrey for the first California Constitutional Convention
 1850 - California admitted to Union
 1850s - Hydraulic mining in gold region contaminates Sacramento Delta with silt and mercury
 1850 - California Indian Protection Act removes Indian's civil rights and enslaves them,  starting the mass genocide of many of the state's 300 tribes
 1850 - California adopts British Common Law causing 70 years of disputes over water rights
 1850 - Squatters cut down the world's largest Blossom Rock Redwoods and clearcut the groves on Peralta and Moraga's ranchos in Oakland hills 
 1851-90 California Lands Commission - Mexican-American Ranchos lost to whites
 1851 - Catholic Church attempts to get land for Mission tribes from California Lands Commission but fails
 1851-1890 - Indians populations decimated 
 1851 - Tribes Rounded up by U.S. Army and forced to sign 18 treaties
 1850 Swamp Act - Enables Henry Miller to eventually own over 1 million acres of land in the Central valley
 1853 - Americans cut Mother of the Forest causing international uproar
 The history of Clearcutting in the Sierra Nevada Mountains resulted in expanded flooding and environmental degradation 
 1853 - First documented American irrigation ditch constructed in Visalia, Tulare County 
 1855 - Van Ness ordinance - State adopts illegal grab of San Francisco lands
 1860 - San Francisco beats U.S. Government in Supreme Court over land claims 
 1861 - Chinese build Sacramento Delta levees
 1862 - Sacramento and levees destroyed by flooding - levees rebuilt
 1862 - Lincoln passes Transcontinental Railroad Act giving away 140 million acres to railroad barons
 1862 - Homestead Act allows adults who never took up arms against the government the right to claim 160 acres
 May 14 - California legislation permits the formation of canal construction companies 
 1866 - San Francisco wins Supreme Court case and all illegal land takings
 1866 - The University of California formed as Land-grant university with the right to take public lands
 1866 - Mining Act included the right of miners to take public lands for ditches and dams
 1869 - Transcontinental railroad completed - new immigration rush
 1869 - First systematic Irrigation was in Anaheim and Riverside
 1872 - Desert Land Act allows irrigation and lands in the west
 1872 - California Irrigation Act passed by the state legislature allowing for cooperative water irrigation development.
 1872 - US Mining Act
 1873 - Congress sets up the Alexander Commission to design an irrigation system for the Central Valley.
 1874 - Alexander Commission report sent to congress in March
 1878 - Workingmen's Party takes control of state government on an anti-railroad campaign
 1878 - William Hammond Hall obtains $100,000 to produce statewide irrigation plan - project collapses
 1879 - New Constitution for state passed by workingmen bans Southern Pacific R.R. lobbying
 1880 - Formation of California Railroad Commission known today as the California Public Utilities Commission
 1884 - The use of Hydraulic mining in gold mining of the Sierra's damages Sacramento watershed and is forced to stop
 1886 - Miller-Lux Cattle Ranch v. Tevis-Haggins water wars: Riparian v. Prior-appropriation water rights 
 1887 - State of California establishes the Modesto Irrigation District
 Mar 7 - California Wright Act okays the formation of irrigation districts.  It was renamed as the California Irrigation District Act in 1917.
 1890 - Canal Act reserved federal authority for right of way to canals on public lands
 1898 - San Francisco passes Charter that calls for public ownership of transit, telephones, water and power
 1899 - Elwood Mead is appointed by the U.S. Department of Agriculture to carry out irrigation surveys 
 1901 - Right to Construct Reservoirs by corporations on public lands 
 1902 - National Reclamation Act passed that created the United States Bureau of Reclamation (USBR)
 1902 - Tulare Irrigation District v. Shepard irrigation district legal dispute
 1905 - Owens valley water plan okayed by Los Angeles Water Commission
 1905 - $40 million statewide irrigation plan fails to due to lack of financing support
 1905 - Salton Sea created by irrigation diversion of Colorado River
 1907 - City of San Francisco votes to construct a water and power supply known as Hetch Hetchy that is located Yosemite
 1911 - Constitutional Act - California Railroad Commission takes over regulatory role of cities for electric rates
 1913 - Water Commission Act attempts to sort out the state's water rights
 1913 - The Raker Act passes, permitting San Francisco to build a public water and power system at Hetch Hetchy
 1915 - State Water Problems Conference setup holding hearings the following year - decision Riparian rights the problem
 1915 - California Irrigation Act declared unconstitutional by state supreme court 
 1917 - California Hawson Bill provides relief to water appropriator claims from Riparian Rights lawsuits
 1918-20 - State suffers severe drought
 1919 - Chief Hydrographer of the USGS Robert Bradford Marshall sends report titled the "Irrigation of Twelve Million Acres in the Valley of California" to Governor William Stephens Marshall is considered the father of the Central Valley Project
  Jan 14 - The city of Oroville Ca. moves ahead with plan to purchase PG&E gas and power operations
 Feb 3 -  U.S. presidential candidate Senator Hiram Johnson is in favor of public ownership of electric utilities
 Feb 18 -  Glenn County Ca. considers formation of an Irrigation district to take advantage of planned Iron Mountain dam

 1920 Jan 4 -  Sacramento Valley Irrigation Association calls for water congress at the Capital 
 Jan 10 -  The U.S. Corps of Engineers proposes 3 dams and a series of locks on the Sacramento River
 Jan 14 - Western States request $250 million for irrigation projects
 Jan 23 - The Yuba-Nevada-Sutter Water and Power Association established for 80,000 acre water and power project
 Jan 23 - Santa Barbara plan to add powerhouse as way to pay for the city's Gibraltar dam project
 Jan 24 - Eureka Chamber of Commerce opposes proposed dam across Eel River others opposed due to fishing impacts
 Jan 29 - PG&E which relies heavily on hydro-electricity prepares emergency power plans due to lack of rainfall
 Feb 8 - Interior Secretary Franklin Lane requests $12.8 million for annual western irrigation funding
 Feb 8 - The Sacramento Union asks public to "Pray for rain" on the front page of its newspaper
 Feb 11 - Nevada County farmers protest PG&E's attempt to divert their water supplies at California Railroad Commission
 Feb 24 - Miller & Lux legal fight against the Madera Irrigation District to take water from the San Joaquin River 
 Feb 25 - Major Water and Power rationing announced due to Northern California drought
 Feb 26 - The Sacramento Valley water and irrigation congress asks governor to call a special legislative session on drought
 Mar 13 - Proposal to build three powerhouses and divert American River water for irrigation in Placer County
 Mar 25 - Ninety California power companies meet and agree to let state power administrator manage power during crisis
 April 21 - PG&E announces plans to spend $15 Million in next two years on new power development
 April 30 - Sacramento politicians call for takeover of PG&E's electric and transit system
 May - The National Electric Light Association releases its National Water power report
 May 1 - PG&E announces $10 million plan to construct hydro-electric dams on Pit River
 May 11 - The California Railroad Commission (CPUC) emergency plan opposed by the Association of Irrigation Districts of Northern California
 May 13 - PG&E acknowledged during hearings that it used ratepayer money for political campaigns
 May 17 - Yolo County announces plan to create 100,000 acre irrigation district
 May 18 - Proposal to construct dam across the Carquinez Strait to stop saltwater incursions
 May 27 - Impacts of Clearcutting Sierra Nevada's Forests and flooding Central Valley made public
 June 7 - Water wars between Northern California irrigation districts and Contra Costa and Delta farmers over salt water incursions
 June 10 - 1920 Federal Water Power Act Signed into law that allows for expediting nationwide development of hydro-electric projects on U.S. rivers
 June 20 - PG&E applies to state railroad commission for rule changes to protect itself during power and water shortage
 July 4 - U.S. War Department begins investigation of building 4 dams and mobile locks on Sacramento River
 July 10 - PG&E curtails afternoon water pumping in five irrigation districts 
 July 13 - City of Antioch starts lawsuit against rice farmers that threatens Water supply
 July 24 - The Madera Irrigation District starts the Madera dam project on San Joaquin River which later becomes Friant Dam
 July 27 - California representative protests Nevada's plan to take Lake Tahoe water
 July 28 - 800,000 acres of Miller-Lux land and water rights to be subdivided and sold to small farmers
 July 31 - The Glenn-Colusa irrigation district announce plan for a 1 million acre reservoir in Shasta county
 Aug 5 - Irrigation companies organize their own plan for water development
 Aug 15 - Colonel Robert B Marshall of USGS Plan introduced at Sacramento Valley Development Assoc.
 Aug 24 - War Department's plan for four Dam dragged into lawsuit between Antioch and California rice farmers
 Sept 26 - Major support for state Marshall Plan announced
 Oct 7 -  Carquinez Straights dam not feasible
 Oct 11 - Court case between Rice farmers and Antioch continues
 Oct 17 - Marshall Plan will ask state legislature for $500,000 survey
 Oct 30 - The California State Irrigation Association expands its operations and support for statewide Marshall water plan
 Nov 10 - California League of Municipalities to cooperate in legislation on public power and water
 Nov 11 - Valley Cities urged to develop public power
 Nov 20 -  Klamath Chamber of Commerce opens hearings on public vs. private power and water development
 Nov 21 - Locals opposed to California-Oregon Power Company's Klamath River power monopoly
 Dec 21 - Giant Boulder Dam plan on Colorado River by Southern California Edison announced
 1920 PUC report on SVWCo

 1921 - The Municipal Utility District Act (MUD Act) passed by the California Legislature
 Jan 5 - Marshall Plan proposes Shasta dam to be located at Kennett rather than Iron Mountain
 Jan 7 - State Senator M.B Johnson introduces California Water and Power senate bill
 Jan 7 – 13 years of bloodshed and litigation end with PG&E winning water rights 
 Jan 11 - The California State Irrigation Association and Sacramento Union promotes Marshall Plan review
 Jan 21 - $500,000 for Marshall water plan study introduced at state legislature
 Jan 29 - League of California Municipalities develop plan for public power legislation
 Jan 29 - Sacramento City Attorney attacks California Railroad commission for bias towards PG&E
 Jan 30 - Marshall Plan endorsement by League of California Municipalities
 Feb 23 - Marshall Plan endorsed by Southern California municipalities 
 Mar 10 - The California State Irrigation Association sends Col. Marshall's list of 346 reservoir candidates to the League of California Municipalities
 Mar 14 - Details of the Marshall Plan promoted by the California State Irrigation Association 
 Mar 15 - Municipal Utility District law results in heavy debate
 Mar 20 - State, federal and global impacts on the passage of the 1920 Water and Power Act
 Apr 2 - San Francisco Commonwealth Club opposes Marshall Plan during legislative hearings in Sacramento
 Apr 2 - Attempt by electric company supporter to kill Johnson's Water and Power Bill fails in Senate
 Apr 21 - Growing concern in San Joaquin Valley over Southern California power companies taking hydro-electric sites
 Apr 22 - Marshall Plan for Sacramento River irrigation survey given $200,000 by legislature
 Apr 26 - Johnson Power & Water Bill 397 loses by 4 votes in assembly committee
 Apr 28 - Municipal Utility District Act passed by state senate
 Apr 30 - Sacramento Union editorial calls for statewide vote after electric company lobby kills Johnson Power Bill
 May 4 - Sacramento City Commission resolution calls for emergency meeting of League of California Municipalities (248 cities)over Johnson bill
 May 9 - Sacramento City Attorney says public ownership could reduce electric rates from 8 cents to .8 cent
 May 17 - Sacramento City Commission report on building its own hydro-electric site on Silver Creek 
 May 20 - Plan setup for statewide public power initiative at emergency meeting of League of California Municipalities
 May 20 - California State Irrigation Association endorses Marshall plan and Municipal League's statewide vote 
 May 24 - Governor signs Municipal Utility District Act into law
 June 4 - $200,000 survey fund for Marshall Plan signed by governor
 July 1 - Miller and Lux loses its lawsuit to stop the Madera Irrigation District from using water from the San Joaquin river
 July 22 - Summary of the proposed Water and Power Act is modeled like the Ontario Canada hydro-electric system
 July 27 - State Water & Power Act initiative petition drive announced
 July 28 - Sacramento City Attorney Robert Shinn comes out against statewide Water and Power initiative 
 Aug 4 - Riverside Chamber of Commerce circulates claim of "City Against Country" over Los Angeles public power
 Aug 29 - Committee redraft of initiative accepted by Shinn with petition gathering for 120,000 signatures to begin 
 Sept 29 - California state control of water and power urged by former Interior Secretary Gifford Pinchot
 Sept 14 - $500 million public Water and Power plan will be on the 1922 election 
 Nov 15 - state funded Marshall survey of water resources begins
 Nov 22 - Water and Power initiative attacked by state senator
 Dec 29 - Herbert Hoover placed in charge of Colorado River Commission that is reviewing plan for Boulder dam
 Dec 29 - State railroad commission okays PG&E plan for $5 million to expand its Pit River hydro-electric developments
 Dec 31 - Water & Power Initiative qualifies for November 1922 statewide ballot

 1922 Jan 1 - World's highest dam proposed at Boulder Canyon 
 Jan 6 - The Water and Power Initiative qualifies for the November 1922 ballot
 Jan 22 - PG&E front group "Greater California League" attacks water and power act
 Feb 23 - Antioch decides to build reservoirs to store water to counter summer salt-water incursions 
 Feb 24 - PG&E president attacks water and power act initiative at Modesto Progressive men's Business club
 Mar 7 - California State Irrigation Association comes out against water and power initiative
 Mar 17 - Boulder (Hoover) Dam okayed
 Apr 1 - Summary of the Water and Power Act debate held by the Commonwealth Club of California
 Apr 2 - Application for major Shasta water diversion by engineers from San Joaquin Light & Power company
 Apr 16 - Full page attack against Water and Power act published by S.F. Chronicle
 Apr 30 - San Francisco Chronicle claims water and Power act is an attempt to "foist communism on people"
 May 4 - Supreme Court to rule on PG&E ratebase inclusion of $52 million decision by state railroad commission 
 Jun 11 - Robert Marshall comes out against the Water and power act (he later reverses himself)
 Sep 28 - Water and Power Act leader, Rudolph Spreckels blames power companies for his ouster at bank
 Sep 30 - First phase in PG&E's $100 million Pit River hydro-electric project turned on
 Oct 2 - Riverside Daily Press prints story that lies about Rudolph Spreckels and power and water act history
 Proposition 19 - Water and Power Initiative Summary and full wording
 Nov 9 - Proposition 19 (Water and Power Act) loses (243,604 to 597,453)
 Nov - 1922 Water and power Act initiative fails due to $3 million dollar electric industry PR campaign
 Water & Power Act electric company fraud investigated in 1934 by FTC.  Testimony placed expenditure at over $1 million against initiative - working on cite - 
 Dec 1 - Water Power Act supporters plan for a new initiative attempt for 1924
 1923 Feb - California media fails to expose $14,000 bribe, uncovered during senate investigation, to California State Irrigation Association by electric front group for reversing support of water and power initiative
 Feb 12 - State Senate investigation exposes opponents spent $234,000 to stop the Water and Power initiative
 Feb 13 - San Francisco Civic League of Improvement given $4,000 to distribute 200,000 flyers against Water and Power initiative
 Feb 13 - Former SF Mayor and labor leader given $10,000 to oppose initiative while unions were all for it
 Feb 13 - Southern California newspaper reports $393,000 spent against water and power initiative
 Feb 16 - New PG&E filings with senate investigation place total spent against water and power initiative at over $500,000
 Feb 24 - P.H. McCarthy forced to resign from San Francisco Trades Council due to his role in water and power initiative
 Feb - Senate Hearings Summary - 1934 12-12 - Federal Trade Commission Investigation: pg 268-273 of 1922 initiative
 July 23 - Sacramento County voters form the Sacramento Municipal Utility District. 
 1924 Proposition 16 Water and Power Summary and full text 
 Sept 3 - Col. Robert Marshall comes out in favor of power and water initiative
 Sept 6 - Arguments for and against Prop 16, the water and power act with Robert Marshall making the for statement
 Oct 28 – Robert Marshall speaks in favor of Water and Power Act
 Nov – California Municipalities League attempt at Water & Power fails again
 1925 June 20 - San Francisco board of supervisors illegally sells Hetch Hetchy power to PG&E
 Note - Add link to actual propositions from hastings... 
 1926 Proposition 18 Water and Power summary and full text
 1926 - California Water & Power Initiative fails for 3rd time
 1927 - Cal Bulletin #18 Cal irrigation District Laws
 1929 - $390,000 authorized to investigate state's water resources
 1930 - Federal-State Water Resources Commission report proposes federal project
 1931 - state water plan legislature report proposing new CVP plan
 Jan 30 - The Hoover-Young Commission report estimate that state water plan will cost $374 million

 1933 Mar. 4 - Franklin D. Roosevelt sworn in as president includes major public works projects
 July 8 - Bureau of Reclamation (USBR) okays funding for Central Valley Act (CVP)
 Jul 15 - Details of CVP legislation announced with plan to cooperate with USBR
 Jul 20 - CVP bill stalls in legislature when rules committee blocks it
 Jul 22 - CVP legislation revived in state senate after federal support promised
 July 27 - California Legislature votes for CVP Act assembly passing it 58-9 senate passes vote 23-15.
 Aug - PG&E funds petition drive for referendum that was run by a company lawyer named Aherne
 Aug 5 - Governor signs $170 million CVP Act into law
 Dec 15 - Local state representative urges a yes vote on CVP while large PG&E opposed is to the right of article
 Dec 15 - SF Chamber of Commerce openly opposes CVP Act
 Dec 17 - CVP special election debate pros and cons along with map of project
 Dec 19 - Voter Information Guide for Proposition One - CVP special election
 Dec 19 - CVP referendum to go ahead wins 459,712 for to 426,109
 Dec 21 - Great Water Project vote increases CVP vote status
 CVP victory due to dead Catalina cow with Slovenian community vote over fisherman's felony conviction
 1933 - SF Labor Council obtains PG&E political expenditures report to state 
 1933 - PG&E spent $275,737.18 on political and other donations according to State Railroad Commission 
 1934 Nov 6 - Sacramento, CA votes to form Sacramento Municipal Utility District (SMUD) and purchase PG&E properties with  $12 million in bonds
 1935 Jan 2 - PG&E files suit to try to overturn the formation of SMUD and its buyout of PG&E
 Aug 30 - Rivers and Harbors Act authorizes $12 million funding by Army Corps of Engineers for CVP - never happens
 Dec 2 - USBR takes over CVP, loans $4.2 million - new estimate increases to $228 million source 1942 CVP Writers Project
Dec 2 - USBR regulations stipulate that water only be given out to farmers with 160 acres of land or less - see 4-7-1944 
 1936 June 22 - Sacramento and San Joaquin Flood Control Studies okayed by Rivers and Harbors Act 1936
 Sept 12 - Ceremonies at Kennett for Shasta Dam
 Oct 19 - Contra Costa Canal Work begins
 Oct 22 - Governor hears $477 million CVP plan
 1938 Mar 2 - State water authority commissioner opposed to agreement between PG&E and SMUD
 Jul 6 - contract $35.9 million for Shasta reservoir given
 Sept 8 - Shasta Construction work starts
 1939 - Fortune Magazine Map of PG&E territory
 Nov 5 - Construction of $8.7 million Friant Dam begins
 Nov 27 - Pacific Gas & Electric Co. proposes to buy and distribute all of Shasta Dam power

 1940 - US v. San Francisco Interior Sec. Ickes wins case to force San Francisco via the Raker Act to stop its sale of Hetch Hetchy water to PG&E
 Jan 7 - California legislature blocks Governor Olson proposal to unfreeze $170 CVP Bonds 
 Jan 19 - Central Valley association spokesperson opposed to $50 million CVP bonds is actually a PG&E lobbyist
 Jan 22 - Interior Sec. Ickes advises state to setup Public utility market for Shasta at half PG&E prices
 Jan 24 - The Water Project Authority of California votes to delay Olson $50 million bond proposal until new study is done
 Jan 27 - Governor Olson opens legislative session with request for CVP Power bonds
 Jan 30 - Madera Irrigation District calls for vote about governor Olson's $50 million CVP bond proposal
 Feb 14 - Governor Olson and CVP senate supporters fail to get $50 million funding out of committee
 Feb 28 — State Water Project Authority creates four new jobs along with survey money from legislature allotment 
 Mar 12 - U.S. Senate approves $5 million for CVP
 May 3 - Federal request for $191 million, including over $25 million to California for flood control following wet winter
 July 8 - First concrete poured at Shasta Dam
 Jul 22 - Sacramento and San Joaquin rivers diverted as work on CVP dams get underway
 Aug 20 - CVP Contra Costa canal delivers first water to city of Pittsburg
 Sep 25 - CVP will irrigate 3 million acres and allow for increased Central Valley population
 Oct 5 - Madera Tribune posts photo of USBR's Friant Dam construction
 Oct 19 - President Roosevelt signs rivers and harbors authorization bill (HR9972)with funds for CVP but includes limitation
 Nov 27 - Governor Olson goes to Washington to propose federal takeover of CVP due to state funding opposition
 Dec 6 - Another CVP dam proposed south of Shasta dam near Iron Mountain
 Dec 19 - Governor Olson obtains support for his CVP plan after meeting with president Roosevelt
 Dec 21 - State water commission requests a federal delay on PG&E's request for hyro work near Shasta dam
 1941 Jan 8 - state senate proposal to expand the size of the CVP project to include Sacramento Valley
 Jan 20 - Congressional oversight of $446 million CVP project based on TVA model is ready 
 Feb 14 - CVP contracts have helped companies in 40 different U.S. states
 Feb 21 - $50 million CVP federal funding in exchange for PG&E Feather River power
 Mar 20 - The state water authority budgets $200,000 for CVP work, including cooperative federal projects
 Apr 17 - Interior Secretary Ickes prepares legislation for federal oversight of the CVP
 Apr 30 - Congress approves a $34.7 million budget for CVP
 May 22 - State legislature agrees to include funding for CVP electricity
 Jul 28 - The CVP project is made a national defense priority with sped up on Keswick Dam contracts to start in August
 July 30 - Central Valley Indian Lands Acquisition Act promised to pay for all Wintu lands covered by Shasta dam
 Jul 31 - FDR signs CVP legislation that takes tribal lands that will be submerged by Shasta and Friant dams
 Aug 12 - First major contract for the $12.5 million Keswick dam awarded
 Sep 17 - CVP statistical report says 1.7 million acre feet of water being diverted from Sacramento River
 Oct 22 - $319,802 contract for 6 miles of Contra Costa Canal awarded
 Dec 30 - Regional director of the USBR, Charles E. is Carey selected by Ickes to develop market search for CVP power customers
 1942 Jan 8 - CVP Shasta and Friant are the 2nd and 4th world's largest dams and rapidly being completed for the war
 Feb 26 - CVP's chief engineer gives detailed status report on CVP to Madera citizens
 Mar 20 - PG&E offers to buy all CVP power during House Appropriation Committee hearings
 Mar 25 - House committee deletes $15 million for transmission lines and CVP steam plant
 Mar 26 - Rep. Voorhis exposes prominent reason PG&E is behind blocking CVP power lines as Sacramento wants to break away from PG&E and buy power at a cheaper rate
 Mar 26 - PG&E gets permission from Federal Power Commission to build steam plant to block USBR's Antioch facility
 Aug 20 - The Madera Tribune congratulates Bertrand W. Gearhart on his role in promoting the CVP
 Nov 13 - Shasta dam nearly ready - construction work photo 
 Nov 21 - Major segments of the CVP project halted by the War Production Board including transmission lines and Friant Dam PG&E allowed to take over CVP power at Shasta
 Nov 27 - state railroad commission sets price of PG&E electric property in Sacramento at $11.6 million
 Dec 22 - Ag Association spokesperson threatens city over city's push to buy power from CVP
 1943 Jun 9 - $30.9 million funds sought for CVP as war power needs expanding
 Jun 19 - War Powers Board okays CVP Friant-Kern Canal funding
 Jul 20 - CVP Shasta to Oroville power line bids opened
 Sep 2 - Interior Secretary Ickes' order to build CVP transmission line attacked by Rep. Carter who represents Tulare county but lives in Oakland
 Sep 8 - San Francisco sends resolution to War Production Board calling for urgent completion of Friant-Kern Canal
 Sep 24 - CVP coordinator announces operational schedules including Friant dam diversion to start in 1944
 Sept 28 - Ickes announces PG&E contract to buy all Shasta dam power agreed to
 Dec 29 - War Production Board refuses to fund the CVP's Friant-Kern Canal
 1944 Jan 14 - 90 year dream - Shasta reservoir is filling up
 Apr 7 - CVP coordinator will follow federal law and block big farms from obtaining CVP water
 Apr 14 - Madera Tribune calls Interior Secretary Ickes "Little Harold" over CVP following federal water use rules
 May 2 - Madera Tribune attacks "Oakies" and Interior Secretary "Little Harold" Ickes as a Czarist for retaining 160 acre water limit
 May 12 - President Roosevelt supports 40 year old 160 acre federal rule that CVP water will only go to small farmers
 Jun 8 - State Senate committee wants 160 acre limit lifted
 June 26 - Shasta dam starts producing Power from two generators
 Jul 20 - Quarter page PG&E Ad promotes its takeover of CVP power
 Jul 24 - Hearings begin on the federal 160 acre water limit campaign by wealthy farmers
 Jul 25 - PG&E starts taking Shasta dam power for resale
 July 26 - Sacramento phase of hearings end. Federal laws will not be broken say federal authorities - for wealthy interests
 Jul 30 - Week long CVP hearings in Bakersfield held by Senate subcommittee on irrigation - 160 acre water limit attacked
 Oct 11 - War Production Board reverses itself and delays work on Friant-Kern Canal
 Elliot Amendment to the Harbors and Rivers Act attempts to remove 160 acre water limit of the 1902 Reclamation Act fails

 1945 Jan 2 - USBR proposes spending $600 million for CVP
 Mar 22 - Rural congressional representatives want more control over CVP but don't want to pay for the system
 Apr 12 - USBR proposes spending $836 million on CVP
 Jun 4 - The state Chamber of Commerce promotes the takeover of the Central valley project when completed
 Jun 8 - Chairman of the Central Valley Project Congress advocates cheap power development for San Joaquin Vallery farmers
 Jul 18 - state water authority funded to evaluate possibility of purchasing the $340 million CVProject
 Sep 6 - New 300 page CVP report calls for dramatic $527 million increase to project for total of $735 million (map)
 Sep 27 - The wartime ban on construction will end in October with $15 million available to start on Friant Dam
 Oct 30 - Attack on federal limits to CVP water for farms less than 160 acres is actually 320 leaving out only giant operations
 Nov 24 - USBR introduces CVP plan to Congress with 38 proposed dams
 Nov 26 - CVP funding ends up in hostile subcommittee that cuts all transmission and power funding
 Nov 27 - U.S. House appropriations committee cuts budge for transmission lines for CVP
 Nov 28 - SF Chronicle fails to mention $5 million cut on transmission line budget, only mentions $780,000 left
 Nov 29 - Chamber of Commerce hears claim that federal control over the CVP is totalitarian
 Nov 30 - SF Chronicle promotes Mendota 42,000 acre family farmer's opinion that employs 400 regular and 1,000 Mexican migratory workers
 Dec 7 - Two day statewide water conference begins with fighting over 160 acre ban
 Dec 8 - The first statewide water conference in 18 years is moderated by Governor Warren - the war of big vs. small farmers
 Dec 26 - Madera Tribune's attempt to be neutral about the 160 acre fight

 1946 Apr 5 - small town newspaper uses front group to call Dept. of Public Works communistic for funding CVP project
 Apr 9 - 96,000 acre feet of Friant dam water released in March 1946 for irrigation of valley
 May 3 - President Truman announces plan to expand scope of CVP
 Jun 18 - CVP obtains $20 million funding for most of its projects
 Jun 22 - Sacramento Municipal Utility District $10.5 million in bonds to purchase PG&E vote agreed to
 Jun 26 - U.S. Senate funding for CVP reduced from $225 million to $12.5 million
 Sep 24 - PG&E announces $160 million budget to expand power output
 Nov 30 - Interior Sec. Krug says need for water and power from CVP being held up by "one or two large corporations"
 1947 Jan 6 - Republican control of state legislature results in funding for only a CVP study
 Jan 6 - Democrats push investigation of monopolist takeover of CVP
 Feb 14 - President Truman requests $30 million including $5 million for CVP transmission lines for the next fiscal year
 Feb 19 - If the 160 acre law is banned 20 giant Central Valley companies will get water monopoly
 Feb 20 - Small farmers and labor oppose repeal of CVP 160 acre water limit
 Feb 27 - 61% of $384 million CVP costs will be paid by electric sales
 Mar 17 - Senator introduces bill to exempt CVP from USBR's 160 acre ban
 Jun 3 - Sixteen day 160 acre ban hearing by Senate ends, no action taken
 Jul 28 - $29 million CVP budget split between Army Corps and U.S.B.R. with $1.5 million for transmission lines
 Sep 18 - CVP project funding and speed to increased with hope to complete entire project by 1950
 Dec 3 - Governor Warren seeks emergency CVP funding 
 Dec 23 - $11.4 million emergency funds for CVP project granted as senator tries to get CVP head fired over 160 acre ban
 1948 Jan 12 - President Truman submits a $42 Million CVP budget for next year
 Jan 15 - Proposal to expand CVP to American River 
 Jan 22 - San Joaquin Valley farmers sign 19 contracts for 320,000 acre feet of water
 Feb 25 - with another drought, the Stale Water Project authority requests $55.6 million for CVP
 Mar 5 - USBR will seek Truman veto if California republican try to overthrow 160 acre ban 
 Mar 18 - two farm groups on opposite of the 160 acre debate
 Jun 5 - Governor Warren supports CVP transmission system - see confusion headline
 Jul 6 - CVP budget for 1948-49 year set at $68.5 million
 Jul 19 - New CVP work to include expansion of Shasta dam power Klamath River and Santa Barbara projects
 Aug 6 - $50 million fund sought to buy up large farms and resell them to small farmers
 Oct 7 - Chamber of Commerce threatens legal fights over CVP's reclamation laws
 Oct 13 - Interior Secretary Krug warns farmers that California electric companies are blocking CVP project
 Nov 30 - State Water Project Authority urges 160 acre law removal
 1949 - Map of Central Valley Cotton producers
 Mar 30 - Major Congressional victory as subcommittee okays transmission lines as part of CVP $53.5 million budget
 Jul 2 - Cal. Assembly funds study to buy CVP
 Jul 9 - 15,000 attend Governor Warren's release of Friant dam water into San Joaquin valley
 Jul 11 - Media says 100 years in the making as 20,000 people attend opening of $58 million Friant-Kern Canal
 Jul 13 - US Senate boosts CVP annual funding to $60.8 million 
 Jul 21 - Senator Downey (R-CA) demands investigation of USBR and it continued 160 acre ban
 Aug 2 - Congress tentatively agrees to fund two more CVP canals for $20–40 million
 Aug 25 - Madera Tribune writes highly manipulative article suggesting Public Power advocates had increased funding yet story details how Senator Knowland (R-Ca) amendment stripped transmission funding
 Aug 30 - President Truman proposes $1 billion CVP expansion for 38 dams and 25 power facilities
 Sep 27 - Friant dam is fourth largest dam in world - details of history and construction
 Sep 27 - U.S. Senate okays CVP addition of $110 million for American River development
 Nov 14 - USBR plans to begin moving water from Sacramento Valley into the San Joaquinn Valley in 1951
 Dec 2 - CVP deal contract with Madera Irrigation District almost settled

 1950 Feb 3 - Gov Warren supports $69 million CVP budget for 1951
 Mar 16 - California house members cut $4 million of power project out of CVP budget
 Apr 14 - The Agricultural Council of California calls the USBR's public power operations socialist
 May 8 - Warning that government should withdraw from CVP if 160 acre ban on water rights removed
 Jun 17 - PG&E attacked by Governor Warren for blocking CVP projects during Shasta Dam dedication
 Sep 19 - Detailed overview of how CVP works and impacts to Madera Irrigation District
1951 Jan 3 - CVP and state agree to keep grasslands flooded to protect migratory birds
 Apr 20 - $18.3 of the $33.8 million CVP annual budget earmarked for Friant-Kern Canal
 May 13 - Friant-Kern Canal completed
 Jul 5 - The California legislature passes legislation to build the Oroville dam and power facilities as part of the CVP system
 Aug 1 - Shasta Dam starts sending water into CVP canals
 Aug 8 - Friant dam ceremony exposes new rift as state court orders excess water released as tactic to flood aquifer
 Sep 13 - PG&E advertisement claim that 55% of all Central Valley water comes from aquifers by electric pumps
 Sep 25 - Madera Tribune does extended coverage of CVP as major milestone in project is completed with historic map
 Sep 25 - History of the Reclamation Act as part of Madera Tribune celebration issue
 Sep 25 - Unnamed (big) farmers take Madera Irrigation District water contract with USBR to court
 1952 Feb 23 - USBR proposes CVP Power plan that would takeover local PG&E project and spark major growth in Fresno 
 Mar 1 - USBR reports 1951 income of $8 million from water sales for 1951 
 Mar 21 - $34.9 million budget okayed by congress for construction activities
 May 2 - Sixteen large farmers representing 14,000 acres agree to take CVP water and eventually abide by 160 acre rule
 Dec 13 - SMUD makes contract to buy CVP power from USBR
 California legislature appropriated $10 million for investigation into state purchase of CVP 
 1953 Jan 9 - President Truman asks for $83 million for CVP construction
 Jan 10 – 110 foot coffer dam at CVP's $58 million Folsom dam breached - no deaths from flooding
 Jan 24 - Madera Tribune enraged that USBR signs a long term contract to sell 17% of CVP excess power to the Sacramento Municipal Utility District
 Jan 28 - Lawsuit to stop all major water diversions a threat to the CVP 
 Apr 23 - House Committee headed by Ca. representatives cuts $7 million from $19 million CVP budget, all from power projects
 May 20 - USBR request to senate that it reinstates $7 million pulled from CVP's power and transmission budget 
 May 28 - State legislature tries to block irrigation district contracts with USBR
 Sep 26 - Full details of the size and cost of Friant dam - the 4th largest concrete dam in world
 Dec 28 - Republicans, corporate farms and state Chamber of Commerce push for state to buy CVP from Interior Dept.
 1954 BR report: Four dams, five canals and other systems have been completed at a cost of $435.4 million 
 Jan 21 - President Eisenhower asks for $70.4 million CVP budget
 May 4 PG&E offers to buy CVP power and facilities for $130 million cash
 Aug 27 - Central Valley Project Act Reauthorization
 Sep 10 - Proposal for $230 million San Luis segment of the CVP announced includes map

 1955 Feb 21 - PG&E makes proposal to buy CVP power from Trinity dam for $3.5 million a year
 Apr 14 - US BR ignores PG&E's proposal to take over the electric system of the $219 million Trinity dam
 Jul 14 -  Urgent need for more water results in Trinity project moving ahead as San Luis project not ready
 Jul 16 - CVP $15 million budget for 1956 will be to complete Folsom Dam and being work on Trinity Dam
 1956 May 21 - Congress appropriates $83 million for irrigation with $20 million going to Central Valley projects including a Tulare Lake dam 
 Jul 19 - US BR announces plans to construct the Glen Canyon Dam and $42 million for five CVP projects for 1957
 1957 - Fear based 28 minute video pushing to expand state expansion of water project 
 Feb 20 - PG&E attacks republican senators opposition to PG&E's proposal for joint construction of Trinity Dam project
 Jun 13 - $88 million for California was given but excluded all funding for transmission systems
 Oct 14 - U.S. Supreme Court agrees to hear the USBR's 160-acre ban on big water users
 Oct 29 - 5 million acre feet a year being extracted from Central Valley's aquifer
 Nov 1 - CVP's Feather River project considered world's largest engineering project
 1958 Jan 23 - PG&E agrees to renegotiate rates it charges for CVP power after report discloses company's rate manipulation
 Feb 5 - Interior Secretary Fred A. Seaton recommends that PG&E be allowed to takeover Trinity Dam power
 Mar 5 - CVP Plan to add 2 million acre feet of water in San Joaquin Valley endorsed
 May 26 - Proposal for San Luis Canal project and 500,000 acres of land in western Merced, Fresno and Kings counties
 Jun 9 - Congress okays $42 million budget for coming CVP's next fiscal year
 Jun 23 - U.S. Supreme Court reverses state supreme court in upholding the 160-acre ban on USBR water to large users
 Oct 15 - Total of 444,000 Kilowatts of CVP power being transfer to PG&E
 1959 Feb 13 - PG&E plan to build "cream skimmer" transmission lines between Bonneville and CVP attacked
 Mar 18 - representative James B. Utt introduces legislation to turn all Trinity Dam power over to PG&E
 Apr 27 - Two more dams proposed for CVP project
 May 12 - Governor Brown releases breakdown on where $1.75 billion funding for State Water Project will go to
 Jun 3 - Congress okays $103 Million with $43 to USBR and $59.8 to Corps of Engineers for state irrigation and flooding
 Oct 21 - California Grange opposed to state takeover of Oroville Dam and giving PG&E control of Trinity Dam electricity
 Jul 9 - Governor Brown signs $1.75 billion state water bond law that includes 735 foot high Oroville Dam
 Sep 30 - Interior Department signs two new contracts with PG&E for 629,000 Kilowatts of CVP electricity from four dams
 Sep 30 - Madera Irrigation District opposed Fresno plan to take San Joqauin River surplus water
 Sep 30 - Interior Department extends PG&E contracts for CVP Power up to April 1971

 1960 State and USBR cooperation Agreement
 Jul 1 - Congress okays $61 million CVP budget
 1961 Feb 2 - State takes first step in $400 State Water Project
 Aug 10 - History of EBMUD and the November 1959 $1.7 billion state water project vote
 1962 - May 17 - $27 million joint CVP funding project proposed
 1963 - Corps of Engineers dredges the Sacramento Deep Water Ship Channel to the port of Sacramento.
 Jan 18 - Congress to propose $106 million annual CVP Budget
 Mar 2 - Governor Brown Announced $325 Million plan to fund state water project
 May 24 - State Senate votes against Governor Brown's proposal to fund state plan with bonds
 June 11 - Attempts by Republicans to kill the sale of $325 million in bonds for state water project fails
 Dec 15 - Extended summary of all the state's new water plans laid out in series of articles by agency
 1964 Jan 13 - SMUD, EBMud and growing construction of dams background story on state water expansion
 Jan 21 - Utility Districts across the state will benefit from expansion of the state water project (map of state plan)
 Jan 22 - $112 million annual CVP budget proposed to congress with state to include $42 million for San Luis
 1965 - Inter-agency Delta Committee recommendation for Peripheral Canal and Delta facilities
 Jan 14 - City of Santa Clara asked LBJ for direct access to CVP vs. PG&E power
 July 23 - $5 billion San Luis Reservoir segment of the CVP begins construction
 Aug 4 - PG&E Hydro-electric project connects 3 rivers near Shasta
 Aug 6 - Auburn-Folsom Project goes before congress for funding
 Sept 16 - Governor Brown request $188 million for CVP funding
 1966 Jan 25 - President Johnson asks Congress for $100 million CVP annual budget
 Mar 11 - 21st Century water shortage predicted if system not expanded
 Apr 3 - State water project good until 1990 but won't handle predicted 54 million population expected by 2020
 Apr 26 - State seeks $164 million from feds for CVP's 1967 fiscal year
 1967 Jan 13 - CVP produces record 5.3 billion kilowatts hours of electricity in 1966
 Jan 25 - President Johnson withholds $34 million for CVP's San Luis project
 Oct 6 - State Water Project's Oroville Dam and Reservoir are completed
 Oct 18 - State Assemblyman seeks $600 million in Bonds for the state's water project
 1968 Feb 8 - State budgets $425 million for state's water project
 Apr 19 - CVP's San Luis Reservoir dedicated
 May 16 - $468 million cut to proposed on CVP's Auburn Dam project
 Dec 28 - Interior Dept. okays new CVP plan along east side of valley
 1969 - State Water Project obtains emergency loan from state treasury as inflation rates have dried up funding from bond sales
 1969 - The Harvey O. Banks Delta Pumping Plant and John E. Skinner Fish Facility are completed by DWR

 1970 Mar 15 - Army Corps of Engineers announces construction of 625 foot high New Melones Dam
 Apr 30 - Governor Reagan promotes $209 million 43 mile long, 400 foot wide Peripheral Canal plan
 1971 Jan 29 - Nixon administration proposes $150 million for state water projects
 Feb 15 - NCPA files Writ with CPUC to stop PG&E power contract with SMUD for Rancho Seco surplus power
 Mar 18 - Sierra Club files lawsuit to shut down the CVP
 Jul 23 - California State Water Resources Control Board sets CVP water quality standards.
 Jul 30 - California Water Resources Association attacks passage of Wild and Scenic Rivers legislation
 Oct 8 - New association of state agencies formed to promote water projects
 1972 Jan 20 - Labor Leader says 45 corporations with 3.7 million acres gets illegal USBR water subsidies
 May 25 - Proposition 9 ban on nuclear development will endanger CVP says California Water Resources Association
 Aug 10 - $4.9 million CVP contract for 25 of 188 mile long San Luis drain awarded 
 Dec 7 - GAO study says big landowners received $1.5 billion CVP water subsidy
 1973 - legislation funds new Delta levees
 Feb 9 - Nixon administration blocks $2 million in CVP funds okayed by Congress
 1974 Feb 14 - History of Peripheral canal plan dates to 1964
 Jul 11 - 29,000-acre Giffen Inc. broken up and sold to comply with 160-acre USBR rules
 Sept 25 - Environmental review for 43 mile long Peripheral canal released
 1975 Sept 4 - Healdsburg joins 10 NCPA other cities to obtain its own electricity
 1976 Jan 28 - USBR says there will be enough water for the year as drought continues
 Mar 24 - 59 farmers file $33 million lawsuit against CVP and SWP for 1974 flood damages
 Apr 22 - Eight mile Pacheco tunnel from San Luis reservoir to Santa Clara started
 1977 - Department of Water Resources supports Peripheral Canal as best way move water to the Delta
 Feb 8 - USBR announces plan to cut CVP water by up to 75% due to drought
 Feb 25 - Westland's Land Dynamics Inc. pleads guilty and fined $10,000 for conspiracy to violate land sale rules
 Apr 17 - President Carter stops 15 water projects including review of CVP
 Apr 21 - Salyer Land and J.G. Boswell Cos. (cotton growers) propose buying $45 million Pine Flat Dam to bypass 160-acre rule
 Sept 15 - Assembly votes 56-22 in favor of SB 346 Peripheral Canal legislation
 Sept 16 - Senate votes down Governor Brown's $4.2 billion Peripheral Canal proposal
 Oct 6 - USBR lost $74 million between 1971 and April 1976 for underpricing electricity sold to PG&E
 Nov 5 - 529 page federal report says USBR has failed to breakup corporate ownership in Westlands over 160 acre limit on water subsidies
 Nov 5 - Government task force report documents $2.7 billion water subsidy to CVP farmers at taxpayers expense
 Nov 5 - Report documents how the USBR's 197 mile long San Luis drain (Kesterson) in the Westlands went from $7 million to $542 million
 Nov 30 - Roberts Farm Inc's 8,100 acre operations in Kern county goes bankrupt and sold for $21.5 million
 Dec 11 - The Chandler family's L.A. Times caught in conflict of Interest over newspaper's attack on 160-acre limit as family owns major investments in Tejon Ranch and J.G. Boswell Company
 Dec 19 - California v. U.S. Supreme Court case over control of discharge rights
 1978 - California State Water Resources Control Board releases Water Rights Decision 1485 (D-1485) requiring Delta water quality
 Jan 6 - Call for one year moratorium over 160-acre ban ruling and Interior Dept decision
 Jan 26 - CVP water rates too cheap as study shows project will be $8.8 billion in debt by 2037
 Feb 8 - PG&E making 800% profit on CVP power it buys
 Feb 20 - Federal Land Bank of Sacramento ignores 160-acre CVP rlimit rule when issuing loans to large farmers
 Mar 18 - Sec. of Interior urges cooperative operations - state charges $22 vs. CVP charging $3.50 per acre foot of water
 July 4 - US Supreme Court rules in favor of state over right to enforce environmental regulations
 Sep 20 - Lobbyists for Salyer Land and J.G. Boswell Cos. who own 150,000-acres of cotton lands paid $165,000 to fight 160-acre limit
 Nov 8 - Fish and Wildlife Improvement Act of 1978 (16 U.S.C. 742l; 92 Stat. 3110) -- Public Law 95-616 updates CVP Act
 Nov 21 - Westlands Irrigation District legal Budget for 1979 set at $549,000 to fight the federal government
 1979 Jan 3 - Dept. of Interior agrees to abide by state's environmental quality rules
 Jan 16 - Bill to allocate $50 Million for state water project including money for Peripheral canal introduced
 Feb 25 - J.G. Boswell investigated for secret contract by Grand Jury with Cotton Inc. (lobby firm) $113 million 10 year budget
 Mar 8 - US Dept. of Agriculture expands probe of Boswell-Cotton Inc. $60,000 annual contract for Cotton Board research and promotion
 Mar 11 - Westlands Irrigation District hires Washington lawfirm of Williams & Connolly to represent their 160-acre legal fight
 Mar 22 - Senate hearings open on the Reclamation Reform Act of 1979 - to replace the 160-acre limit for USBR water 
 Mar 23 - Western water war erupts over hundreds of millions of acres of subsidized lands with call to change 160-acre limitation
 Apr 13 - Support for study calling for 200 foot increase of Shasta Dam 
 Oct 11 - Regional battle between farmers and environmentalists hold up dams and Peripheral Canal plans

 1980 Mar 13 - State legislature passes SB200 Peripheral Canal act opposed by ecologists
 Oct 18 - Santa Clara power users sue agency for $18 million over rates
 1981 Oct 21 - CVP proposal to sell power to city of Healdsburg announced
 1982 - Voters defeat the Peripheral Canal initiative - Proposition 9
 Apr 29 - Santa Cruz to do study on takeover of PG&E power grid
 Apr 30 - Healdsburg to start buying CVP power from Westeran Area Power Administration
 May 4 - Healdsburg breaks from PG&E power
 August 4 - PG&E claims Healdsburg owes them $62,000 as city goes for public power
 1983 Oct 2 - Republicans moves away from conservation on Central Valley water 
 1984 May 5 - National Wildlife Federation says USBR under collected water fees by $10 billion
 Nov 16 - Federal plan to dump Central Valley waste water into Pacific attacked
 1985 Mar 30 - Interior Dept plan to stop dumping Central Valley toxics into Kesterson
 Aug 21 - CVP has made $1.5 billion in illegal subsidies to giant ag farms
 Sep 10 - House passes on cooperative agreement between CVP and SWP
 1986 - DWR-USBR Coordinated Operation Agreement, agreed to by Congress.
 Nov 27 - Ceremony held in Sacramento on agreement between CVP and SWP
 1987 - State Water Board starts revision of D-1485 after U.S. EPA calls plan inadequate.
 1988 - Suisun Marsh salinity control gates start up.
 May 28 - 2nd Dry year starting to impact CVP water supply
 1989 - EPA lists Sacramento River Chinook salmon as threatened
 Feb 16 - USBR announces 25-50% reduction in water availability due to 3 year drought
 May 3 - USBR investigation of expanding Tehama-Colusa Canal
 June 23 - PG&E loses court case over its refusal to transmit power to public agencies

 1990 Feb 16 - 4th year of drought expected to cause cutbacks in water to users 
 Jul 15 - $150 million environmental CVP legislation angers farmers and PG&E
 1991 - State Water Board produces Bay-Delta salinity control plan but partially rejected by the EPA
  Construction completed on four south Delta pumping facilities
 Jan 30 - 800 attend statewide meeting on water crisis solutions
 Feb 13 - Water Rights issue grow as 5th year of drought calls for 50% farm water cutbacks
 Feb 15 - Water crisis worst since 1945, CVP to drain all reservoirs with up 75% restrictions in use
 Mar 16 - Recent storms reduce water crisis but orders for reduced use to hold
 1992 - The Central Valley Project Improvement Act mandated the balancing of water, pricing and distribution policies
 Jan 1 - U.S. Corps of Engineers releases environmental plan for 3,400 acre Yolo Country wildlife refuge
 Feb 13 - Bush administration submits $906 million USBR budget for 1993 including CVP
 Oct 30 - Reclamation Projects Authorization and Adjustment Act of 199—Public Law 102-575
 Nov 18 - New federal legislation will give Yolo and Solano County CVP water
 1993 - A documented indicator species, the Delta smelt is listed as threatened (goes to endangered in 2009) 
 1993 - Save San Francisco Bay Association's Barry Nelson calls the CVP "the biggest single environmental disaster ever to strike California."
 Feb 18 - USBR open new office to oversee 1992 CVP Improvement Act 
 Dec 17 - Governor Wilson attacks federal plans to withhold water for environment
 1994 Feb 16 - Drought response results in 2/3rd cut in farm waters
 Apr 10 - Judge blocks attempt to sell CVP water to mining company 
 Sep 19 - Pajaro Valley loses 19,000 acre feet of CVP water due to legal technicality
 1995 Jul 18 - Folsom Dam gate breaks releasing half million acre feet of water
 1996 Oct 12 - Pajaro Valley water agency decides to buy $5.6 million in CVP water rights
 Dec 21 - Kern County plan to sell 22 billion gallons of water to L.A. starts water war
 1997 - $80 million temperature controlled fish protection support added to Shasta dam
 Sept 13 - Cadillac Desert author supports more subsidies to farmers
 Dec 14 - Proposal to sell Friant dam water to L.A. reduced to just excess flow years
 1998 May 29 - Measure D in Pajaro Valley alternative to CVP plan attacked for conservation and small dams
 Jun 3 - Measure D passes, effectively ending plan to import CVP water into Pajaro Valley

 2000 - Westlands Water District sues the USBR over drainage promises and wins $2.6 billion agreement
 Jun 9 - $450 million water plan proposed by Governor Davis includes raising Shasta dam height
 2002 Feb 13 - Appeal of court ruling taking CVP water from fish and environment
 Jul 17 - Westlands wants feds to buy contaminated land for $500 million
 2004 - CalFed budget zeroed out for fifth year in a row as attempts to find common ground fail
 Apr 22 - Editorial: death of 34,000 fish on Klamath impacts Hupa tribe 
 Jul 14 - Court order allows for protection of fish in Trinity River
 2005 Mar 16 - CVP water resold by users as 200,000 acres in Westland's too toxic for growing
 2006 - San Joaquin water flows restored to protect fish 
 2007 May 25 - Federal court overturns U.S. Fish and Wildlife's 2005 opinion that increased CVP water take would not endanger Smelt
 Oct 25 - "Racanelli Decision" - Judge decides in favor of Aug. 1978 decision (1485) compelling USBR and DWR adhere to the State Water Resources Control Board's water quality standards
 2008 - Central Valley Project Improvement Act's fisheries program conducts "Listen to the River" independent peer review
 Apr 9 - CVP's Lewiston dam predicted to have a normal reservoir levels for year 
 Aug 9 - The Kern County Water Agency buys state water for as cheap as $28 and sells it for up to $200 and acre
 2009 - A documented indicator species, the Delta smelt is listed under the ESA as endangered (listed as threatened in 1993)
 Mar 11 - Drought fears recede after recent rain bring CVP's Lewiston dam up to 59% of normal
 May 24 - How the Ca. Dept. of Water Resources lost control of the Kern Country Water Bank
 Jun 5 - National Oceanic and Atmospheric Administration releases 4 year study on fish impacts
 Oct 7 - Trinity County protests USBR's petition to extend state water rights to 2030

 2010 Jun 3 - Environmental groups file a lawsuit seeking to block a secret backroom deal – known as the "Monterey Amendments"
 Dec 15 - The release of the Bay Delta Conservation Plan, or the reincarnation of peripheral canal is immediately opposed by environmental groups
 2012 Mar 2 - Court of Appeals ends thirteen year legal battle between Westlands and Interior Dept in government's favor
 2014 May 14 - 10% of all California goes to Almond production
 Nov 4 - After 5 years of reworking,  the public okays $510 million in state water funding
 2015 Jan 27 - Harvard University has bought 10,000 acres California land for Wine production and water speculation
 Apr 21 - California Almond production is using over 1 trillion gallons of agricultural water 
 Sep 11 - USBR announces agreement with Westlands water contract and drainage controversy
 2017 Jan 3 - HR 23 Central Valley Project Water Reliability introduced and passed by house fails in senate would have stripped all CVP environmental protections
 Feb 17 - CVP's Oroville Dam spillway water levels result in 180,000 people forced to evacuate
 Mar 17 - House republicans invoke the "God Squad" option of the Endangered Species Act Amendments of 1978 to overturn water limits caused by the endangered Smelt
 Jun 10 - Trump admin proposes selling off all grid assets of the Power Marketing Administration
 2018 - Congress set aside $20 million to raise Shasta dam by 18.5' or an additional 636,000 acre feet of water a year
 2019 Aug 1 - Meeting to start new Delta Tunnel by state agencies held
 Sep 8 - Westlands Irrigation District appeals court decision to block raising height of CVP's Shasta dam
 Aug 21 - Trump admin suppresses report on dangers to Steelhead Salmon
 Oct 23 - Dept. of Interior changes water rules in favor of farmers

 2020 - Jan 1 - No Smelt indicator species found in the Sacramento Delta for last 2 years
 Feb 20 - President Trump signs Record of Decision on federal biological opinions
 Feb 29 - Seventy five project customers, including the large Westlands Water District, received permanent federal water contracts

Facilities in the Sacramento Valley

Sacramento River 

Shasta Division consists of a pair of large dams on the Sacramento River north of the city of Redding. The Shasta Dam is the primary water storage and power generating facility of the CVP. Shasta Dam functions to regulate the flow of the Sacramento River so that downstream diversion dams and canals can capture the flow of the river more efficiently, and to prevent flooding in the Sacramento-San Joaquin Delta where many water pump facilities for San Joaquin Valley aqueducts are located. The Keswick Dam functions as an afterbay (regulating reservoir) for the Shasta Dam, also generating power.

The Sacramento Canals Division of the CVP takes water from the Sacramento River much farther downstream of the Shasta and Keswick Dams. The Red Bluff Diversion Dam diverts part of the Sacramento River into the  Tehama-Colusa Canal, the  Corning Canal and a small reservoir formed by Funks Dam. Six pump plants take water from the canal and feed it to the Colusa County water distribution grid.

Trinity River 

Water diversions from northern rivers in the state remain controversial due to environmental damage. Trinity River Division is the second largest CVP department for the northern Sacramento Valley. The primary purpose of the division is to divert water from the Trinity River into the Sacramento River drainage downstream of Shasta Dam in order to provide more flow in the Sacramento River and generating peaking power in the process. Trinity Dam forms Trinity Lake, the second largest CVP water-storage reservoir, with just over half the capacity of Shasta and a generating capacity of 140 MW. Lewiston Dam, downstream of Trinity Dam, diverts water into the Clear Creek Tunnel, which travels to empty into a third reservoir, Whiskeytown Lake on Clear Creek, a tributary of the Sacramento River, generating 154 MW of power in the process. Whiskeytown Lake (formed by Clair. A Hill Whiskeytown Dam) in turn provides water to the Spring Creek Tunnel, which travels into the lowermost extreme of Spring Creek, a stream that flows into Keswick Reservoir, generating another 180 MW of electricity. From there the water from the Trinity River empties into Keswick Reservoir and the Sacramento River. In 1963, the Spring Creek Debris Dam was constructed just upstream of the outlet of the Spring Creek Tunnel, to prevent acid mine drainage from the Iron Mountain Mine from continuing downstream and contaminating the river.

American River 

The American River Division is located in north-central California, on the east side of the Great Central Valley. Its structures use the water of the American River, which drains off the Sierra Nevada and flows into the Sacramento River. The division is further divided into three units: the Folsom, Sly Park and Auburn-Folsom South. The American River Division stores water in the American River watershed, to both provide water supply for local settlements, and supply it to the rest of the system. The dams also are an important flood control measure. Hydroelectricity is generated at Folsom and Nimbus dams, and marketed to the Western Area Power Administration.

The Folsom Unit consists of Folsom Dam, its primary water storage component, and Nimbus Dam, which serves as its downstream forebay. The Folsom Dam is located on the American River, and stores  of water in its reservoir, Folsom Lake. Eight additional earth fill saddle dams are required to keep the reservoir from overflowing. The dam also generates 200 MW from three generators. The dam generates 7.7 MW from two Kaplan turbines on the north side of the river. The Nimbus Fish Hatchery is located downstream of Nimbus Dam, to compensate for the two dams' destruction of American River spawning grounds.

The Sly Park Unit includes Sly Park Dam, Jenkinson Lake, the Camp Creek Diversion Dam, and two diversion tunnels. Jenkinson Lake feeds the Camino Conduit, a  aqueduct. The Camp Creek Diversion Dam diverts some water from Camp Creek into Jenkinson Lake.

The third unit is the Auburn-Folsom South Unit, consisting of several dams on American River tributaries. These include Sugar Pine Dam and Pipeline (supplying water to Foresthill), and the uncompleted Folsom South Canal. The primary component of the unit, concrete thin-arch Auburn Dam, was to be located on the North Fork of the American, but was never built because of the significant risk of earthquakes in the area, and general public opposition to the project. However, the high Foresthill Bridge, built as part of the preliminary work for Auburn Dam, still stands.

Facilities in the San Joaquin Valley

Delta and canal system 
One of the most important parts of the CVP's San Joaquin Valley water system is the series of aqueducts and pumping plants that take water from the Sacramento-San Joaquin Delta and send it southwards to supply farms and cities. The Delta Cross Channel intercepts Sacramento River water as it travels westwards towards Suisun Bay and diverts it south through a series of man-made channels, the Mokelumne River, and other natural sloughs, marshes and distributaries. From there, the water travels to the C.W. Bill Jones Pumping Plant, which raises water into the Delta-Mendota Canal, which in turn travels  southwards to Mendota Pool on the San Joaquin River, supplying water to other CVP reservoirs about midway. A facility exists at the entrance of the pump plant in order to catch fish that would otherwise end up in the Delta-Mendota Canal. A second canal, the Contra Costa Canal, captures freshwater near the central part of the delta, taking it  southwards, distributing water to the Clayton and Ygnacio Canals in the process, and supplying water to Contra Loma Dam, eventually terminating at Martinez Reservoir.

San Joaquin River 
The CVP also has several dams on the San Joaquin River—which has far less average flow than the Sacramento—in order to divert its water to southern Central Valley aqueducts. The Friant Dam, completed in 1942, is the largest component of the Friant Division of the CVP. The dam crosses the San Joaquin River where it spills out of the Sierra Nevada, forming Millerton Lake, which provides water storage for San Joaquin Valley irrigators as well as providing a diversion point for a pair of canals, the Friant-Kern Canal and the Madera Canal. The Friant-Kern Canal sends water southwards through the Tulare Lake area to its terminus at Bakersfield on the Kern River, supplying irrigation water to Tulare, Fresno, and Kern counties. The Madera Canal takes water northwards to Madera County, emptying into the Chowchilla River. The Central Valley also consisted of 500 miles of canals, providing the city dwellers and power sales from the generation of electricity pay of the project costs.

Stanislaus River 
On the Stanislaus River, a major tributary of the San Joaquin, lies the relatively independent East Side Division and New Melones Unit of the CVP. The dam functions to store water during dry periods and release it downstream into the northern San Joaquin Valley according to water demand. The dam generates 279 MW of power with a peaking capacity of 300 MW.

Offstream storage and aqueducts 

The CVP has a significant amount of facilities for storing and transporting water on the west side of the San Joaquin Valley, in the foothills of the California Coast Ranges. The West San Joaquin Division and San Luis Unit consist of several major facilities that are shared with the federal California State Water Project (SWP). San Luis Dam (or B.F. Sisk Dam) is the largest storage facility, holding  of water.
Although called an offstream storage reservoir by USBR, the reservoir floods part of the San Luis Creek valley. San Luis Creek, however, is not the primary water source for the reservoir. Downstream of San Luis Reservoir is O'Neill Forebay, which is intersected by the Delta-Mendota Canal, a separate CVP facility. Water is pumped from the canal into the Forebay and uphill into San Luis Reservoir, which functions as an additional water source during dry periods.

Water released from San Luis and O'Neill reservoirs feeds into the San Luis Canal, the federally built section of the California Aqueduct, which carries both CVP and SWP water. The San Luis Canal terminates at Kettleman City, where it connects with the state-built section of the California Aqueduct. The Coalinga or Pleasant Valley Canal branches off the San Luis Canal towards the Coalinga area. A pair of separate dams, Los Baños Detention Dam and Little Panoche Detention Dam, provide flood control in the Los Baños area. The San Luis Drain was a separate project by USBR in an attempt to keep contaminated irrigation drainage water out of the San Joaquin River, emptying into Kesterson Reservoir where the water would evaporate or seep into the ground. Because of environmental concerns, the system was never completed.

San Justo Dam stores water diverted from San Luis Reservoir through the Pacheco Tunnel and Hollister Conduit, which travel through the Diablo Range. A separate canal, the Santa Clara Tunnel and Conduit, carries water to the Santa Clara Valley.

Environmental impacts 

Once, profuse runs of anadromous fish—salmon, steelhead, and others—migrated up the Sacramento and San Joaquin Rivers to spawn in great numbers. The construction of CVP dams on the two rivers and many of their major tributaries—namely Friant Dam and Shasta Dam—mostly ended the once-bountiful Central Valley salmon run. From north to south, the Sacramento upriver of Shasta Dam, the American upriver of Folsom Dam, the Stanislaus upriver of New Melones Dam, and the San Joaquin upriver of Mendota—have become inaccessible to migrating salmon. In three of these cases, it is because the dams are too high and their reservoirs too large for fish to bypass via fish ladders. The San Joaquin River, however, had a different fate. Almost  of the river is dry because of diversions from Friant Dam and Millerton Lake. Even downstream of Mendota, where the Delta-Mendota Canal gives the river a new surge of water from the Sacramento-San Joaquin Delta, irrigation runoff water, contaminated with pesticides and fertilizer, has caused the river to become heavily polluted. To make matters worse, efforts by the California Department of Fish and Game to route the San Joaquin salmon run into the Merced River in the 1950s failed, because the salmon did not recognize the Merced as their "home stream".

Not only on the San Joaquin River have CVP facilities wreaked environmental havoc. On the Sacramento River, Red Bluff Diversion Dam in Tehama County, while not as large or as impacting as Friant Dam, was once a barrier to the migration of anadromous fish. The original fish passage facilities of the dam continually experienced problems from the beginning of operation in 1966, and introduced species that prey on young smolt often gather at the base of the dam, which reduced the population of outmigrating juvenile salmon into the Pacific. The Red Bluff Diversion Dam has since been replaced with a fish screen and pumping plant, thus allowing unimpaired passage through Red Bluff. Further upstream, Keswick and Shasta Dams form total barriers to fish migration. Even out of the Central Valley watershed, the CVP's diversion of water from the Trinity River from Lewiston Dam into Whiskeytown Lake has significantly hurt the Klamath River tributary's salmon run. Over three-quarters of the river's flow is diverted through the Clear Creek Tunnel and away from the Trinity River, causing the river below the dam to become warm, silty, shallow and slow-flowing, attributes that hurt young salmon. In the early years of the 21st century, the Bureau of Reclamation finally began to steadily increase the water flow downstream from Lewiston Dam. While providing less water for the CVP altogether, the new flow regime allows operations to meet the line drawn by Reclamation itself in 1952 stating that at least 48% of the river's natural flow must be left untouched in order for Trinity River salmon to survive. The lack of flow in the Trinity up to then was also a violation of the authorization that Congress made over the operation of the dam. The "...legislation required that enough be left in the Trinity for in-basin needs, including preservation of the salmon fishery."

In the early years of the 21st century, the Bureau of Reclamation studied the feasibility of raising Shasta Dam. The agency also proposed a smaller raise of  that would add . When Shasta Dam was first built, it was actually planned to be two hundred feet higher than it is now, but Reclamation stopped construction at its present height because of a shortage of materials and workers during World War II. The raising of the dam would further regulate and store more Sacramento River water for dry periods, thus benefiting the entire operations of the CVP, and also generating additional power. However, the proposed height increase was fought over for many reasons. Raising the dam would cost several hundred million dollars and raise the price of irrigation water from Shasta Lake. It would drown most of the remaining land belonging to the Winnemem Wintu tribe—90 percent of whose land already lies beneath the surface of the lake—and flood several miles of the McCloud River, protected under National Wild and Scenic River status. Buildings, bridges, roads and other structures would have to be relocated. The added capacity of the reservoir would change flow fluctuations in the lower Sacramento River, and native fish populations, especially salmon, would suffer with the subsequent changes to the ecology of the river.

New Melones Dam has come under even greater controversy than Shasta Dam, mainly because of the project's conflicts with federal and state limits and its impact on the watershed of the Stanislaus River. The original Melones Dam, submerged underneath New Melones Lake (hence the name New Melones Dam) is the source of one of these problems. The disused Melones Dam blocks cold water at the bottom of the lake from reaching the river, especially in dry years when the surface of the lake is closer to the crest of the old dam. This results in the river below the dam attaining a much higher temperature than usual, hurting native fish and wildlife. To solve this problem, Reclamation shuts off operations of the dam's hydroelectric power plant when water levels are drastically low, but this results in power shortages. Originally, after the dam was constructed, the State of California put filling the reservoir on hold because of enormous public opposition to what was being inundated: the limestone canyon behind the dam, the deepest of its kind in the United States, contained hundreds of archaeological and historic sites and one of California's best and most popular whitewater rafting runs. Furthermore, the project allows a far smaller sustainable water yield than originally expected, and Reclamation calls the dam "a case study of all that can go wrong with a project".

In response to these environmental problems, Congress passed in 1992 the Central Valley Project Improvement Act (CVPIA), Title 34 of Public Law 102-575, to change water management practices in the CVP in order to lessen the ecological impact on the San Joaquin and Sacramento Rivers. Actions mandated included the release of more water to supply rivers and wetlands, funding for habitat restoration work (especially for anadromous fish spawning gravels), water temperature control, water conservation, fish passage, increasing the service area of the CVP's canals, and other items. Despite the preservation of river programs, the state legislature continued to have the power to construct dams.

CVP Government Library 

  1902-1966 US Bureau of Reclamation Annual Appropriations
 1923-1949 US Buruea of Reclamation - Reclamation Era Bulletins - includes monthly reports on projects and highlights
 1948 US Bureau of Reclamation Project Reports
 1949 CVP Comprehensive Report
 1950 CVP Annual Report
 1952 US Bureau of Reclamation 50th Anniversary
 1955 CVP Annual Report & Highlights
 1956 CVP Annual Report & Highlights
 1957 CVP Annual Report & Highlights
 1958 CVP Annual Report & 
 1959 CVP Annual Report & Highlights
 1960 CVP Annual Report & Highlights
 1961 CVP Annual Report & Highlights
 1962 CVP Annual Report & Highlights
 1963 CVP Annual Report & Highlights
 1964 CVP Annual Report & Highlights
 1965 CVP Annual Report & Highlights
 1966 CVP Annual Report & Highlights
 1967 CVP Annual Report & Highlights
 1968 CVP Annual Report & Highlights
 1969 CVP Annual Report & Highlights
 1970 CVP Annual Report & Highlights
 1971 CVP Annual Report & Highlights
 1971 US Bureau of Reclamation Annual Report
 1972 CVP Annual Report

 1950 United States v. Gerlach Live Stock Co., 339 U.S. 725 (1950) Riparian Rights
 1958  Ivanhoe Irrig. Dist. v. McCracken, 357 U.S. 275 (1958) 160-acre limitation
 1960 Ivanhoe Irrig. Dist. v. All Parties, 53 Cal.2d 692 (1960) irrigation districts contracts
 1963 Dugan v. Rank, 372 U.S. 609 (1963) Friant Dam Water Rights
 1963 City of Fresno v. State of California, 372 U.S. 627 eminent domain and water rights
 1973 Environmental Defense v. Armstrong, 487 F.2d 814 (9th Cir. 1973) New Melones Dam environmental impacts
 1976 National Land for the People, Inc. v. Bureau of Reclamation, 417 F. Supp. 449 (D.D.C. 1976). Injunction against DOE land sales
 1977 Trinity County v. Andrus, 438 F. Supp. 1368 (E.D. Cal. 1977) drought impacts
 1978 California v. United States, 438 U.S. 645 (1978) water distribution and rights
 1981 California v. Sierra Club, 451 U.S. 287 (1981) Delta Water quality
 1982 United States v. State Water Resources Control Board, 694 F. 2d 1171 (9th Cir. 1982) New Melones water permits
 1982 United States v. State of California, 529 F.Supp. 303 (E.D. Cal. 1982) Delta Water Quality Control Plan
 1982 Morici Corp. v. United States, 681 F.2d 645 (9th Cir. 1982) Federal immunity claim over crop damages
 1983 Westlands Water District v. United States, 700 F.2d 561 (9th Cir. 1983) Environmental impacts and legal intervention
 1985 South Delta Water Agency v. United States, 767 F.2d 531 (9th Cir. 1985) South Delta's water rights
 1985 SWRCB Water Quality Order No. WQ 85-1 Kesterson Reservoir mitigation
 1986 United States v. State Water Resources Control Board (182 Cal. App.3d 82 (1986) ("Racanelli Decision") State Water Resources Control Board's Delta water quality plan and Water Rights
 1990 Peterson v. United States Dept. of Interior, 899 F.2d 799 (9th Cir. 1990) environmental impacts and water rights
 1993 Madera Irr. Dist. v. Hancock, 985 F.2d 1397 (9th Cir. 1993) water contracts 
 1993 Barcellos and Wolfsen, Inc. v. Westlands Water District, 899 F.2d 814 (9th Cir.1990) subsidized water contracts
 1993 Sumner Peck Ranch, Inc. v. Bureau of Reclamation, 823 F.Supp. 715 (E.D. Cal. 1993) environmental impacts 
 1994 Westlands Water Dist. v. NRDC, 43 F.3d 457 (9th Cir. 1994) environmental impacts
 1995 O'Neill v. United States, 50 F.3d 677 (9th Cir. 1995) water contracts
 1995 California Trout v. Schaefer, 58 F.3d 469 (9th Cir. 1995) environmental impacts and water contracts
 1996 Westlands Water Dist. v. United States, 100 F.3d 94 (9th Cir. 1996) Water contracts
 1997 County of San Joaquin v. State Water Resources Control Board, 54 Cal.App.4th 1144 (1997) New Melones water allocations
 1998 Natural Resources Defense Council v. Houston, 146 F.3d 1118 (9th Cir. 1998) Environmental Species Act enforcement
 1999 Central Green Co. v. United States, 531 U.S. 425 (1999) Friant dam flood liability
 2000 Firebaugh Canal Co. et al., v. United States, 203 F.3d 568 (9th Cir. 2000) Kesterson drain
 2001 State of California v. United States, 271 F.3d 1377 (Fed. Cir. 2001) Kesterson impacts
 2002 Central Delta Water Agency v. United States, 306 F.3d 938 (9th Cir. 2002) New Melones Reservoir intervenor legal standings
 2003 Westlands Water District v. United States, 337 F.3d 1092 (9th Cir. 2003) water contracts
 2003 Laub v. U.S. Department of the Interior (9th Circuit, 2003) Environmental Impacts 
 2004 Bay Inst. of San Francisco v. United States (9th Cir., unpublished, 87 Fed. Appx. 637, January 23, 2004) water rights and 1992 CVPIA
 2004 Westlands Water District v. U.S. Department of Interior, 376 F. 3d 853 (9th Cir. 2004) Environmental impacts
 2004 Natural Resources Defense Council v. Patterson, 333 F.Supp.2d 906 (E.D.Cal. 2004) Friant Dam environmental state v. fed
 2005 Orff v. United States, 545 U.S. 596 (2005) Water contracts
 2005 Hoopa Valley Indian Tribe v. Ryan, 415 F.3d 986 (9th Cir. 2005) Water contracts
 2006 State Water Resources Control Board Cases, 136 Cal.App. 4th 674 (2006) Water rights
 2006 Central Delta Water Agency v. Bureau of Reclamation, 452 F.3d 1021 (9th Cir. 2006) water salinity
 2007 Stockton East Water District v. United States, 76 Fed. Cl. 321 (2007), amended by 76 Fed. Cl. 470 New Melones Reservoir water contracts 
 2007 Pacific Coast Federation of Fishermen's Associations v. Gutierrez, U.S. District Court for the Eastern District of California, Case No. 1:06-CV-00245 OWW environmental impacts on salmon
 2007 Laub v. Davis, California Supreme Court Case No. S138974;  CALFED environmental impacts
 2009 NRDC v. Kempthorne 627 Supp 2d 1212 - Delta Smelt impacts
 2010 Consolidated Delta Smelt Cases, 717 F. Supp. 2d 1021 (E.D. Cal. 2010) District Court, E.D. California
 2010 San Luis & Delta-Mendota Water Auth. v. Salazar, 760 F. Supp. 2d 855 (E.D. Cal. 2010) water contracts environment
 2018 Hoopa Valley Tribe v. National Marine Fisheries, et al. and Yurok Tribe, et al. v. United States Bureau of Reclamation fishing rights

 1955 7-6 Report on USBR, for the Fiscal Years Ended June 30, 1952 and 1953
 1958 11-18 Report on Acquisition, Leasing, and Disposal of Reclamation Lands, Bureau of Reclamation
 1957 12-11 Audit of CVP for the Fiscal Year Ended June 30, 1956
 1962 4-26 Revenue-Producing Water Resources Development Projects, USBR and Corps of Engineers, Fiscal Year 1960
 1968 10-18 Negotiation of Contracts for Water From the CVP
 Congress Should Reevaluate the 160-Acre Limitation on Land Eligible To Receive Federal Water
 1973 11-19 CVP's Proposed Power Rate Increase
 1974 1-21 Comments on Proposed Power Rate Increase by the USBR's CVP
 1974 8-1 Financial Position of the CVP
 1977 4-14 Allegations Concerning Westlands Water District
 1977 9-2 More and Better Uses Could Be Made of Billions of Gallons of Water by Improving Irrigation Delivery Systems
 1977 11-21 Rationale for Power Rates Charged by the CVP to Pacific Gas and Electric Company
 1979 3-22 Cotton Production by California Farmers Who Receive Irrigation Water
 1981 4-21 Information on the Resale of Water Provided Under Contract by the Federal Government in California
 1982 7-18 Obligation of Funds for CVP's for Fiscal Year 1978
 1983 6-18 Proposed Pricing of Irrigation Water From CVP's New Melones Reservoir
 1983 10-5 Archeological Studies at New Melones Dam in California
 1984 1-4 USBR Rates for Electric Power Sales by the CVP
 1982 1-18 Information On California Delta Water Quality Standards
 1984 5-21 Query Concerning Repayment of O&M Costs Under CVP
 1985 9-9 Bureau of Reclamation's CVP Repayment Arrangements
 1987 7-17 Kesterson Wildlife Management: National Refuge Contamination Is Difficult To Confirm and Clean Up
 1989 10-12 Basic Changes Needed to Avoid Abuse of the 960-Acre Limit
 1991 10-21 Changes Needed Before Water Service Contracts Are Renewed
 1994 4-18 Impact of Higher Irrigation Rates on CVP Farmers
 1994 8-15 Federal Actions to Protect Sacramento River Salmon
 2001 5-4 Water Marketing Activities and Costs at the CVP
 2007 12-18 Reimbursement of CVP Construction Costs by San Luis Unit Irrigation Water Districts
 2014 9-8 USBR: Availability of Information on Repayment of Water Project Construction Costs
 2015 6-4 Financial Information for Three California Water Programs
 2018 8-16 SF Bay Delta Watershed: Wide Range of Restoration Efforts Need Updated

CVP resources

  The U.S. Dept. of Interior's US Bureau of Reclamation is the federal agency that manages the CVP: Annual reports 1995-to present
 The U.S. Dept. of Energy's Western Area Power Administration oversees distribution of the CVP's federally produced electricity
 The U.S. Army Corps of Engineers manages 17 of the Central Valley Project dams including its dam safety alert system
 Licensed Hydroelectric Projects at the Federal Energy Regulatory Commission
 The National Oceanic and Atmospheric Administration Central Valley Regional Office monitors the CVP's Endangered Species Act Operations
 U.S. Department of Justice - Central Valley project Environment and Natural Resources Division
 -  U.S. Geological Survey's California Central Valley Water Science Center
  USGS California Central Valley Groundwater Study Tool
 USGS Groundwater Data for California
 Central Valley Hydrologic Model: Texture Model
 USGS Goose Population Dynamics in the California Central Valley and Pacific Flyway
 Central Valley Watershed Monitoring Directory
 Findlaw California Water Code Search Engine
 The California State Water Project (SWP) is managed by the California Department of Water Resources 
 Central Valley Flood Protection Plan
 Association of California Water Agencies
 Directory - Association of California Water Agencies
    Sacramento Valley Water Quality Coalition (SVWQC)
 Overview of Projected Climate Change in the California Central Valley | California Climate Commons
  Regulated Water Utilities in California | California Water Association
 The California Reclamation Districts are the legal districts that manage the Central Valley's levees
 California Water Districts
 Ca. Dept. of Water Resources: Central Valley History
 Chronology of Major Litigation Involving the CVP and SWP
 The California Sportfishing Protection Alliance's Listen to the River peer review summary
 The California Water Plan is the state's official water policy with the latest version completed in 2013 
 Water in California Summarizes the history and details of the state's water policy issues. 
 California's Irrigation district's 92 public self-governing subdivisions of the State that purchase water from the CVP
 Central Valley Ag - CVA
 MAVEN'S NOTEBOOK | California Water news
 UC Davis: California Water Primer
 Mid-Pacific Water Users' Conference
 Water Education Foundation
 Library of Congress - Central Valley Project
 CVP annual construction costs 1935-1959
 1945 U.S. Bureau of Reclamation 160-acre Legal analysis
 US Bureau of Reclamation Documents - Hathi Trust Digital Library
 "The Central valley project" by Federal Writers' Project (U.S.) California, 1942
 1956 Congressional Library on authorizing Documents Central Valley Project - Includes detailed timeline
 1,600 page investigation of USBR that includes the Reclamation Reform Act of 1979: Hearing Before the Subcommittee on Energy
 1984 Information Bulletin #2 U.S. BUREAU of RECLAMATION - KESTERSON RESERVOIR - AND WATERFOWL - Impacts
 1986 - The Agreement between the United States of America and the State of California for coordinated operation of the Central Valley Project and the State Water Project
  The Grapes of Wrath Movie & book
 Cadillac Desert documentary & book
 Farmworker movements in California from the Grange, IWW and the Wheatland hop riot, the Bracero's to the United Farm Workers
 Bitter Harvest, a History of California Farmworkers, 1870-1941 By Cletus E. Dani 
 Dorothea Lange Central Valley - PBS Biography
 The Great Central Valley Project by Stephen Johnson, Robert Dawson and author Gerald Haslam
 The Southern Pacific railroad, currently known as BNSF Railway was the Central Valley's largest owner and played a major role in its evolution, from the Mussel Slough Tragedy, the California Development Company's Salton Sea, its land grabs
 California's version of Pork barrel politics started with the Owens Valley land and water takings by the city of Los Angeles with a PBS documentary series Part 1 and movie Chinatown (1974 film)
 The Central Valley is also the home to one of the country's oldest and largest oil & gas industries, that includes the environmental controversial. use of fracking.

Gallery

See also 
 CALFED Bay-Delta Program
 Cadillac Desert -about the book- and Cadillac Desert (film)
 California Department of Water Resources
 California Reclamation Districts
 California State Water Project
 California Water Wars
 Droughts in California
 Environment of California
 Environmental issues in Fresno, California
 Rivers and Harbors Act
 Sacramento–San Joaquin River Delta
 San Joaquin River
 Water in California

References

External links 
 Central Valley Project Operations Office
 http://www.sacmetronews.com/2018/02/tribes-fishermen-slam-trump-plan-to.html
 Central Valley Project Summary
 Central Valley Project Historic Photos
  The Central Valley Project: Informational page and slideshow of project facilities, Mavens Notebook
 USBR Glossary of Terms
 "Food for 70,000,000 – How Engineering Wil Aid Nature in California's Central Valley". Popular Science, March 1944, pp. 95–98.

 
1933 establishments in California
Agriculture in California
Energy infrastructure in California
History of California
Interbasin transfer
Irrigation in the United States
San Joaquin Valley
United States Bureau of Reclamation